Burundi is a unitary state which is sub-divided at three levels: provinces, communes, and collines (hills).

Divisions

Provinces

The largest administrative division in Burundi is the province. There are 18 provinces in Burundi, each named after its provincial capital. Each province has a Provincial Governor. The provincial organisation of Burundi has been reformed on a number of occasions. The most recent province, Rumonge, was created in 2015.

The provinces are Bubanza, Bujumbura Mairie, Bujumbura Rural, Bururi, Cankuzo, Cibitoke, Gitega, Karuzi, Kayanza, Kirundo, Makamba, Muramvya, Muyinga, Mwaro, Ngozi, Rumonge, Rutana and Ruyigi.

Communes

The second-largest administrative division is the commune (municipality). There are 117 communes in Burundi.

Collines

The smallest subdivision in Burundi is the colline (literally "hill") of which there are 2,638 in the country.

References 

 
Burundi
Burundi